Ita Aber ( Herschcovich; born 1932) is an American feminist multimedia textile artist, art conservator and curator.

Early life and career
Ita Aber was born in Montreal, Quebec, Canada as 
Ita Herschcovich to Fannie ( Zabitsky) and Tudick Hershcovich. Her grandparents were of German, Polish, Russian, and Romanian Bukhara ancestry.

Her first exposure to feminism was by her grandmother, an early suffragette in Canada, and her mother, who founded the Milk Fund of Canada. She took courses in Jewish history, archaeology, art and textile conservation at Queen's College, Columbia University, the Jewish Theological Seminary, and New York University. She completed a bachelor's degree in Cultural Studies from Empire State College and carried out graduate-level studies at The Valentine Museum (Richmond, Virginia), and the Metropolitan Museum of Art, earning a master's degree equivalent in Jewish Art.

In 1964, Aber became politically active, specifically in the Reform Democratic movement.  Through her early political involvement, she sought to abolish laws in New York restricting abortion. She helped found Women Strike for Peace, and also became active in the environmental movement, speaking out against the pollution in the Hudson River. At this time, she also became active in equal rights activism, minority and elder rights.

Aber was a founding member of the New York Feminist Art Institute and the founder of the Pomegranate Guild of Judaic Needlework.  Starting in 1972, she taught needlework   at the Jewish Museum, the Cooper-Hewitt Museum and other venues throughout the eastern United States.

Aber's artistic-related archives are held at the Archives of American Art, with other archival collections being held by the National Museum of Women in the Arts. Her family's papers are held at Yeshiva University.

Exhibitions
2001: "55 Year Retrospective Exhibition", Broome Street Gallery
2007: "Ita B'Ita: Ita Aber in Her Time: 60 Years of Creativity and Innovation by Ita Aber", Yeshiva University Museum

Bibliography
The art of Judaic needlework: traditional and contemporary designs, Scribner, 1979, ;
Art of Judaic Needlepoint, Simon & Schuster, 1982,  
Ita H. Aber, Frann S. Addison, Katya Apekina, Beverly Auerbach, Tradition today: modern Judaica and folk art, Jewish Arts Foundation, 1990

References

External links
Exhibition HEROIC VISIONS & WORLD COSTUMES, FABRIC ART by ITA ABER and sculptures by LINDA STEIN at the Anita Shapolsky Art Foundation: May 22 through July 9, 2006.

Ita Aber collection items at Yeshiva University Museum
Ita Aber collection at the Jewish Museum
Ita Aber archival collection at the Canadian Jewish Archives
Ita Aber object at the Museum of Arts and Design, NYC

1932 births
Textile artists
American textile artists
Living people
20th-century American women artists
20th-century women textile artists
20th-century textile artists
Canadian emigrants to the United States
21st-century American women